Silvia Stefanova Radoyska (Bulgarian: Силвия Стефанова Радойска) is a Bulgarian football midfielder, currently playing for NSA Sofia in the Bulgarian Championship. She has also played for Sporting Huelva in the Spanish Superleague. She first played the European Cup in 2004 with Supersport Sofia.

She is a member of the Bulgarian national team, and currently serves as its captain.

On 30 January 2016 she was the first awarded as Bulgarian Women Footballer of the Year for 2015.

Awards

Club
SuperSport Sofia
 Bulgarian WFC (1): 2003–04

NSA Sofia
 Bulgarian WFC (10): 2005–06, 2006–07, 2007–08, 2008–09, 2009–10, 2010–11, 2011–12, 2012–13, 2013–14, 2014–15
 Bulgarian Cups (7): 2007, 2008, 2009, 2010, 2012, 2013, 2014

Individual
 Bulgarian Women Footballer of the Year (1): 2015

References

1985 births
Living people
Bulgarian women's footballers
Bulgaria women's international footballers
Bulgarian expatriate sportspeople in Spain
Expatriate women's footballers in Spain
Primera División (women) players
Sporting de Huelva players
Women's association football midfielders
FC NSA Sofia players